Richard Steinmetz is an American actor, best known for his role as Martin Fitzgerald on the now-defunct NBC daytime soap opera Passions.

Early life 
A native of Chicago, his was a police officer on the South Side. Steinmetz graduated from high school in Federal Way, Washington, a suburb of Seattle, and played professional soccer for the Portland Timbers.

Career
After playing professional soccer, he left for San Francisco and then moved to New York City, where he worked on stage for nearly 10 years. In addition to acting, Steinmetz coaches high-school football. His team, the Venice Gondoliers, made it to the City Championships last year, where they played in front of 40,000 people.

Steinmetz made his daytime television debut in 1988 on the now-defunct ABC series Loving as Jeff Hartman, a role which he held for only a year. He had a major supporting role in the action-thriller 'Skyscraper', a 1996 direct-to-video film starring Anna Nicole Smith, where he played her screen character's detective husband. However, Steinmetz was best known as Martin Fitzgerald, whom he portrayed from May 2004 to October 2006, when Steinmetz was dropped to recurring status, and the character subsequently disappeared from the show without explanation. In May 2012, it was announced that Steinmetz would join the cast of ABC's General Hospital as the son of a previous character with a past connection to popular character Sonny Corinthos. On July 2, 2012, Steinmetz made his first appearance on the series in the role of Joe Scully, Jr. On September 15, 2012, it was announced that Steinmetz's contract with General Hospital would not be renewed. Steinmetz made his last appearance on the series on October 23, 2012.

Personal life 
Steinmetz is resides in Los Angeles, and is the foster father of three sons.

Filmography

Film

Television

References

External links

American male soap opera actors
Living people
Male actors from Chicago
People from Federal Way, Washington
Beauty pageant hosts
1959 births